This is a list of the present and extant lords in the peerage of the Kingdom of Spain.

Lords in the peerage of Spain

See also
Spanish nobility
List of dukes in the peerage of Spain
List of viscounts in the peerage of Spain
List of barons in the peerage of Spain

References

Bibliography

External links
Consejo de la Grandeza de España: Title guide

  
Lordships
Lordships
Spanish noble titles
Spain